Delamar may refer to:

In Nevada:
 Delamar, Nevada
 Delamar Dry Lake
 Delamar Mountains
 Delamar Wash
 Delamar Flat
 Delamar Valley
 Delamar Landing Field

In Idaho:
 De Lamar, Idaho
 DeLamar Mine

In other uses:
 DeLaMar, a theatre in Amsterdam

See also